Luka Ploče is a Croatian port operating company which operates port facilities at the port of Ploče, in southern Croatia. It is listed on the Zagreb Stock Exchange.

References

External links

Business services companies established in 1952
Companies listed on the Zagreb Stock Exchange
Port operating companies
Transport companies of Croatia
1952 establishments in Croatia